SpaceX CRS-14, also known as SpX-14, was a Commercial Resupply Service mission to the International Space Station launched on 2 April 2018. The mission was contracted by NASA and was flown by SpaceX. This mission reused the Falcon 9 first stage booster previously flown on CRS-12 and the Dragon capsule flown on CRS-8.

Mission overview
In early 2015, NASA awarded a contract extension to SpaceX for three additional CRS missions (CRS-13 to CRS-15). In June 2016, a NASA Inspector General report had this mission manifested for February 2018. The flight was then delayed to 9 February and 13 March 2018.

Launch occurred on 2 April 2018 at 20:30 UTC on a Falcon 9 Full Thrust rocket from Cape Canaveral Air Force Station Space Launch Complex 40. The Dragon spacecraft rendezvoused with the ISS on 4 April; it was captured by Canadarm2 at 10:40 UTC and was berthed to the Harmony module at 13:00 UTC. It remained there for just under 31 days before being unberthed by Canadarm2 on 5 May 2018, scheduled for 05:30 UTC. The spacecraft was released at 13:23 UTC and autonomously backed away from the station to a safe distance before firing its thrusters for a deorbit burn at 18:06 UTC. Dragon splashed down in the Pacific Ocean at 19:03 UTC to be retrieved by a SpaceX recovery crew and transported to the Port of Los Angeles, returning  of cargo to Earth.

No attempt was made to recover the first stage booster; instead, the booster was used to conduct experimental maneuvers designed to test the limits of its flight trajectory.

Payload
NASA contracted for the CRS-14 mission from SpaceX and therefore determined the primary payload, date/time of launch, and orbital parameters for the Dragon space capsule. The unpressurised component is composed of two external station experiments, Atmosphere-Space Interactions Monitor (ASIM) and Materials ISS Experiment Flight Facility (MISSE-FF), and a Pump and Flow Control Subassembly (PFCS) orbital replacement unit for the station.

Multiple payloads from national labs are also included, one of which is the RemoveDEBRIS mission which will be deployed from the ISS. The mission aims to test a harpoon and a net on test debris that the mission carries to evaluate the viability of these methods to be used in future missions to remove real space debris. At the end of the mission the RemoveDEBRIS spacecraft will deploy a large dragsail to accelerate its own deorbit to avoid becoming space debris itself. HP was also contracted by NASA to install a new inkjet printer for the US lab.

The following is a breakdown of cargo bound for the ISS:
 Science investigations: 
 Crew supplies: 
 Vehicle hardware: 
 Spacewalk equipment: 
 Computer resources: 
 New HP Workstation laptops
 HP Envy inkjet printer
 Russian hardware: 
 External payloads: 
 Atmosphere-Space Interactions Monitor (ASIM)
 Materials ISS Experiment Flight Facility (MISSE-FF)
 Pump and Flow Control Subassembly (PFCS)

See also
Uncrewed spaceflights to the International Space Station
List of Falcon 9 and Falcon Heavy launches
2018 in spaceflight

References

External links
 
 Dragon website at SpaceX.com
 Commercial Resupply Services at NASA.gov

SpaceX Dragon
Spacecraft launched in 2018
Spacecraft which reentered in 2018
SpaceX payloads contracted by NASA
Supply vehicles for the International Space Station